Mirta Toledo (born 1952) is an Argentine artist (painter, sculptor, print maker and writer), that promotes diversity through her artwork.

Personal life
Mirta Toledo was born in the Almagro neighborhood of Buenos Aires. She is the oldest daughter of Toribio Toledo (Afro-Guarani) and Eva García Román (Spaniard).  Since early childhood she was conscious of the ethnic diversity within her own family that later on influenced her artwork. Toledo cites her father as the driving force in her art, who "instilled in her qualities of strength, ambition and values, normally reserved for men in her society. Marriage and family 
In January 1977 Toledo married Dr. Mauricio R. Papini in Buenos Aires, Argentina. From 1980–82 they stayed in the United States in Minneapolis, Minnesota, where their sons were born (1981). They returned to Buenos Aires from 1982–1988, moved to Honolulu from 1988–1990, and then to Fort Worth, Texas from 1990–2000. In 2000 she moved to Austin, Texas where she continued working in her artwork and had solo shows. In 2007, Toledo returned to Buenos Aires where she currently resides and works.

 Education  
Toledo obtained a MFA in Visual Arts with a Major in Painting, from the National University of the Arts in 2011.  In 1985 she completed a residency with master sculptor Antonio Pujía in the National College of Fine Arts Ernesto de la Cárcova. She earned a degree as a Professor of Painting (1974) and Professor of Sculpture (1982) from the National School of Fine Arts Prilidiano Pueyrredón, and a bachelor's degree in Fine Arts (Drawing) from the School of Fine Arts Manuel Belgrano (1973).

Toledo completed two residencies specializing in hand-made fine art serigraphy at Coronado Studio in Austin,Texas: Serie Project V (1998) and Serie Project IX (2002). She also was an artist in residency at Stone Metal Press in San Antonio, Texas (2002).  Toledo was a Class 2002 Alumni of the NALAC Leadership Institute of the National Association of Latino Arts and Cultures.

 Artistic life 

 Sculpture and pottery: 1977–93 
In the late 1970s she focused on sculpture, winning her first awards in that medium from the SAAP (Argentine Society of Visual Artists), the Ministry of Culture of Argentina, and the Dirección General de Educación Artística (1979). His father transmitted to her legends and beliefs of his culture and he was who awakened her love for art. Her themes and inspiration are often similar. The sculptures have indigenous faces, they are people who affirm her past,  and they are the characters of hundreds of stories that he told her as a child. Her works affirm her ethnicity.In 1980 Toledo traveled to the United States for the first time. In 1982 she had her first Solo Show On Angels, Women and Machines at the North Star Gallery of the University of Minnesota in Saint Paul. With those works "she tried to express the transformations our world is passing through in three aspects of our everyday life experience: Religious, Humane and Technological and representing these aspects are the angels, women and machines". In 1982 she returned to Argentina, and continued working in sculpture, participating in numerous competitions and achieving awards.

Toledo moved back to the United States to Honolulu, Hawaii in 1988 where she joined the Hawaii Potters' Guild working on both figurative sculpture and vessel-oriented raku pottery, the latter embellished with designs inspired by the indigenous people of her homeland. Before leaving Hawaii in 2002, she had a Solo Show From the Earth at Backus Gallery of Fine Arts. Toledo exhibited  pottery and figurative sculptures that allows her more range in developing metaphorical potential. Busts of Pachamama, Coquena, Anahí, Sisa-Huinaj are appealing personifications of deities linked to various aspects of Earth's rhythms. Once established in Fort Worth, she continued working in pottery and sculpture for three more years, until she decided to devote herself entirely to painting.

 "Pure Diversity": 1990–present 
This series of paintings deepen in her belief that cultural differences are the "treasure of humanity". Pure diversity reflects the focus of the artist and shows her awareness of the ethnic, cultural and individual diversity within society and her own experience and heritage.  Every society has its own characteristics, values and culture, but I feel that after the twentieth century, with the mass media invading our homes, the whole world has been exposed to "universal" values that we are learning and adopting not only as the truth, but also, as our own. There is not such a thing as "universal beauty", Toledo said. These works envision a society that is equal: "People tell me that I am an idealist, that I dream and I have hopes for a better society. I always said that it is my answer to the vision of a submissive Latin America and the assurance of seeing a diverse evolving world without racism".

She approaches different themes to celebrate the difference among the world's society. Diversity in Religion (portraying gods and goddess from prehispanic Latin America, Caribbean, Africa and European saints). Pure Diversity: Children and Dolls (portraying the ethnic and cultural differences in between children´s and the reflection on the dolls created in their own society) and Pure Diversity: Flowers, Women and Birds ( portraying women from all over, symbolically using birds and flowers to give hidden messages about them). Toledo´s works attest to her identity and the identity of all those fragmented between two cultures, who have had to reconfigure their history on ongoing basis in order to incorporate new voices, while maintaining old voices, so they do not forget the origin of their trip.This series were displayed in Solo Shows at Texas Christian University and Texas Women's University. She gave invited conferences on her theme at several universities including Barnard College in New York (1995), the University of North Carolina at Chapel Hill (1996), the University of Maryland at College Park (1995), TCU (1998) and Southwest Texas State University (2001).  In such conferences her message was clear, that "diversity is a global phenomenon and the only hope and reality for the future". "Traveling through the paintings of Mirta Toledo is to enter into the celebration of diversity. As if it were a huge hug to a diversity present full of beauty, she is moving away from those fears and rejection that causes all the unknown, even if it is close to us. She is oblivious to the theories of racial purity, she questions the idea of "pure"  as opposed to the "different".

In 1997 she was awarded Estrella Award for Outstanding Hispanic Woman in the Arts, by the Hispanic Women's Network of Texas.

In 2002 she had a Solo Show with her Pure Diversity: Children and Dolls at DiverseArts Little Gallery in Austin, Texas.  The flavor of an open mind,Toledo believes that there's only one race, The Human Race, so, if you truly believe it, then you have to believe that the human race is pure diversity. Placing it in terms she was familiar with, she considered how multicultural her doll collection had become and how dolls were a common element in all societies, past and present. Pondering the whole idea gave birth to her signature theme, people and diversity, and to her series, children and dolls. "I try to show that there is hope and beauty," she remarks. "We have to embrace ourselves as a human race, accept the way we are, and we are diverse. Since then, that theme has been the topic of Toledo's short stories and conferences, and it represents the intellectual level of her paintings during the past 14 years. Her dolls have assumed the role as ambassadors of diversity. Her art was on permanent display at Mi Casa Gallery, located in Austin's famous South Congress Cultural District.

"Track of Feelings": 1994–present 
Reacting to the California Proposition 187, in 1994 Toledo created a mixed media triptych of big dimensions: "The Key Word is LOVE " (1994).  The three canvasses presented glued and hand sewn collages of  her drawings about  Aztec, Mayan and African significant art,  and  the portrait of family members. There were also empty panels where immigrants were invited to write about their feelings and experiences in the country. This piece marked the beginning of the series Track of Feelings. In these works not only changes her approach to express the world´s daily historical events, but also her technique.The Colors in the paintings do not blend, but bleed. There is orange and there is blue and the ugly compromises we must make, the shades of meaning where people equivocate  and bury the past, these things are not there. The moldy blending of hue is traded for sharp contrast, clarity, the exact point where night and day play shell games is now captured, again, in a reflection of what has collected in the brushes of Mirta Toledo."No Outlet"  (1997) is the footprint of the so common torture exerted by the military during Argentina's Dirty War. Silhouettes of men and women who once were alive but had no outlet. To the left of the canvas is glued a newspaper article where a woman related how she was tortured while a priest near her was praying. The red acrylic stroke left by the glued brush symbolizes the blood leaving and covering an Argentine ID ... and that human being disappears completely ... not even the person's name exists anymore. In a corner of the canvas a phrase reads: "I was full of life." A shape. A shadow. The weight of memory.

Also from 1997 is "Justice and Memory" referring to the AMIA bombings. This work shows colorful bodies silhouettes of men, women and children of all sizes and colors (made with the Mexican hand cut paper technique) glued to the canvas on a blood red background. There is also a color blue sky section, where a photograph of a black wall shows in white letters a claim: Justice and Memory, along with the list of victims of the attack. As falling from the black wall there are three signs of "Fragile" and, again, the black wall with white lettering claiming  "Justice and Memory", and, below, a request: "Neither hypocrisy, nor complicity!"Toledo´s most complicated art adheres fabric, paper, stamps, news prints and the tools of artistic trade to multilevel paintings that contain references to social or political conditions.  In "Lost Mail" (2000) she incorporates printings of her sister Claudia´s poem "Is Scary to Return" with postmarked mailings, framed in black, then blue, then brilliant orange. This series of artworks was first exhibited in the year 2000 at LanPeña Gallery in Austin, Texas.  Many of the mixed media pieces were looking back from Argentina to Texas, with a developed visual vocabulary meriting a full "Retrospectiva". At the time of her Solo Show, Argentine filmmaker Jorge Coscia was visiting the US and did a documentary on Toledo's artwork:  Lecciones de Vida: El arte de Mirta Toledo (October 2000).

 Mail Art: 2007–present 
Newly moved to Buenos Aires,Toledo began to work immediately in Mail Art. What it is Mail Art? It is essentially non commercial art sent out via the postal system. This art takes the form of envelopes, post cards and often 3-D objects, anything that makes it through the mail. Mail Art is International, with an extensive network of people involved in this compelling form of artistic communication. Mail Art is also democratic and nonjudgmental.

Her first participation was in October 2007 in the call: TeeToTuM 1st. International Art Exhibition "The Philosophy Day". Her painting Tatina Cori was exhibited in the Art Space Vlassis, in Thessaloniki, Greece. Continuing with her diversity theme, she sent two portraits to the Zadarama 2008 call: Cutzalán Woman and African American Teenager. Those were exhibited at Ceske Budejovice International Art Festival in Zadar, Croatia.

In the same line of her paintings and drawings about the women murdered with impunity in Juarez, Toledo answered a call about the "Elimination of Violence Against Women" participating with four artworks: I hit you because I love you, say the abusers,  Elimination of Violence Against Women's Stamps, Mother of Juarez Limited Edition Stamp Collection and a Stop Violence Envelope. The exhibition took place at the Technological Educational Institute of Central Macedonia in November 2008.  Her paintings investigate the enigma of the self, propose possible worlds, and questions the complex situation of women's in today's world. How do women see themselves? And how do others view them from childhood? Thus, a range of women seem to look back at the spectators asking, "What do you see when you look at us?" Toledo has participated with her Mail Art in Australia, Brazil, Belgium, Bangladesh, Canada, Colombia, Chile, Finland, Hawaii, Indonesia, Italy, Japan, Malaysia, Portugal, Spain, Ukraine and the United States.

In May 2008, Raices Culturales Latinoamericanas (in Philadelphia, Pennsylvania) invited Toledo to have a Solo Show. With the body of artwork that she called   ...with the letter M, she conveys her message of the 90's: Art is a magical tool that I use ... We, humans, do not see what is beyond the simple things, not with a pure look. What I see beyond these beliefs full of prejudice are my motivation... And the message of my work is fighting for the tolerance of diversity. The same year, during the months of September and October, the LatinArt Gallery of Philadelphia (now closed) inaugurated its art rooms with a solo exhibition of Mirta Toledo, displaying a retrospective of her work, which includes paintings, sculptures and mixed media.In 2011 her print The tree of life: portrait of my parents was featured in Arte Tejano: de campos, barrios y fronteras an exhibit at OSDE Espacio de Arte (sponsored by the U.S. Embassy in Argentina together with The Smithsonian Latino Center and Fundación OSDE). This exhibition was curated by Cesáreo Moreno.

 Invisible Argentine Heroes of African Descendants: 2012– present  
True to her  celebration of diversity, Toledo painted a series of portraits of  Argentine of African descendants  who, even though contributed in many fields to the making of the nation, were invisible by the Argentina history. Sponsored by IARPIDI, this set of portraits of over twenty African descendants Argentinian Heroes are part of a traveling exhibition that began in the Golden Hall of the House of Culture (2013) and has exhibited in five Districts of Buenos Aires City ever since (2014). This art presentation also crossed the borders of the Federal Capital of Argentina to show in the Art Gallery of the Honorable Council of San Isidro. Dr. Carlos Castellano, (President of the HCSI) expressed his view: To tell you the truth, is a beautiful project that shows the African roots in Argentina, part of a story that unfortunately has been lost for many reasons. Argentina´s history itself has a lot to do with it: the many wars for our independence and wars against adjacent countries which are like brothers, like Paraguay. On those wars many African descendants lost their lives. But besides,  this is also great because show us portraits of artists as Salgán, and heroes as Rivadavia. Essentially this exhibit seeks to work in this so important for democracy that is the process of cultural integration. Writing 
Mirta Toledo started to send her manuscripts to literary magazines in 1990, while living in Fort Worth, Texas. Even though she always has focused on her career as a visual artist, never stop writing and publishing. Her first book is a novel, La Semilla Elemental (1993).  In this book Toledo addresses issues of continued relevance, related to the search for identity and lost blood line of ancestors. The characters are experiencing the anguish and agony of a painful transplant, and they hear the urgent call of the ancestral voice, the impulse to shake the dust of the generations that hides their true Hispanic / Latin American root.  Every story present here speaks about two cultures colliding, found with one goal: domination. The arrival of the conqueror, powers, rights, relations with the inhabitants of the New World, mutual respect, ignorance, neglect, disaster, are some of the peaks on these stories. It is largely a work of denunciation.  With the perspective that only the distance can provide, the author makes a deep look into her national and personal wealth: miscegenation. Spanish blood mixed with Guarani Indians and Blacks, the "new mud" in which the protagonist of the epilogue (written, unlike the all novel, in first person) discover "the elementary seed."

Her short story Jacinto (about the forced disappearance) was chosen to be a part of the Historia de Mujeres, I Antología (1994).  Mirta Toledo, sculptor and painter casually tells us something terrible in her "Jacinto". Her ability to lead us to the unexpected end, speaks volumes in favor of her good fabulating and exquisite connoisseur of individual psychologies, like Ana Lía Gabelli, whose inquiries and particularly her special fondness will result in an area of difficult outlet.Eleven of her short stories (previously published in literary magazines of Canada, United States, Brazil and Argentina) came together in the book Dulce de Leche (1996). The introit of Dulce de Leche is a clear warning to the reader, in which a painful awareness slips to cultural crossroads: "The letters that fail to arrive, is because they do not write, because for my family and friends, I'm just an absence, a memory that does not belong to Buenos Aires anymore ..."  The pain of being uprooted in a preliminary catharsis, the one of Mirta Toledo, Argentine narrator, that  is "in between" , between her current life in Texas and her own memories. To put it more precisely, memories that are the treasure of her writing, provided with a poetic imagination convener.  In 1996 A Century After, one of her short stories, was a finalist of the VIII Award Ana María Matute.

In her stories  most of the characters are marginal, like Juancito, a boy from a slum (Magic Slips);  or Griselda, living between marginalization and the look of a compassionate eye (The Hunchback); or the child who writes with his left hand and traumatizes his father who considered that hand "evil" (The left hand).   But  the story that was published more times in different countries (Argentina, Canada, United States and Spain) is In Between. Written in Spanish (but with the original title in English) since 1999 is a part of every edition of the Spanish Instructor Manual ¡A que sí!  In Between was also translated into English, and together with The Hunchback is part of the book Cruel Fictions, Cruel Realities, Short Stories by Latinamerican Women Writers, edited and translated by Kathy Leonard (1997).Chamamé in the air  (the only story for children that wrote so far), was published in 2006 in Saltimbanqui3 El libro de los sueños, in Buenos Aires, Argentina. As she has done it with Mail Art, Toledo responded to the Second International Call Women Cry, in tribute to women and against violence.  Nearly six hundred Spanish speaking women  poets from more than twenty countries submitted their poems for the Second Call for International Women Poets in honor of the International Poetry Festival of Women Cry performed worldwide by Women Poets International Movement (MPI) INC. Some three hundred voices were selected, Mirta Toledo, with her poem "...with the letter M" was one of them. This call was developed in conjunction by the Library of Great Nations run by Xabier Susperregi Gutiérrez and Women Poets International. The two organizations together edited the book Ecos del grito – Volume I.''

References 

1952 births
Living people
20th-century Argentine women artists
21st-century Argentine women artists
Argentine women painters
Argentine women sculptors
Argentine printmakers
Modern painters
Mixed-media artists
Women printmakers
Artists from Buenos Aires
Latin American artists of indigenous descent
Argentine people of Spanish descent
20th-century Argentine painters
21st-century painters
20th-century Argentine sculptors
21st-century sculptors
20th-century Argentine writers
21st-century Argentine writers
20th-century indigenous painters of the Americas
20th-century printmakers
21st-century Argentine women writers
20th-century Argentine women writers